Yira Yira or variation, may refer to:

 Yira, yira (1931 film) Argentinian film
 "Yira... yira..." (song) Argentine song by Enrique Santos Discépolo
 "Yira Yira" (2008 song) from the album Caribe Gardel by Jerry Rivera

See also

Yira (disambiguation)